Silent Voice, Silent Voices or variants may refer to:

Books
 The Silent Voices, 1892 poetry collection by Alfred, Lord Tennyson, see 1892 in poetry
The Silent Voice, 1977 novel by Christopher Hodder-Williams
 A Silent Voice (manga) (Koe no Katachi), a Japanese manga
Silent Voices novel by Ann Cleeves

Film, stage, television
 The Silent Voice (play), a 1914 stageplay
 The Silent Voice (film), a 1915 silent melodrama film
 The Man Who Played God, a 1932 film also called "The Silent Voice"
 The Silent Voice (The Lone Ranger episode), a 1951 TV episode of The Lone Ranger, see List of The Lone Ranger episodes
 Silent Voices (2005 film), a UK docudrama released on DVD in 2008
 Silent Voice (2009 film), a French drama film
 A Silent Voice (film) (Koe no Katachi), a 2016 Japanese anime film based on the manga
Silent Voice (1987 film), aka Amazing Grace And Chuck, starring Jamie Lee Curtis and Gregory Peck

Music
 Silent Voices (band), a Finnish metal band

Albums
Silent Voice, Sugizo
Silent Voices,  compilation album by Simon & Garfunkel

Songs
"A Silent Voice", song by composer Frederic Cliffe
"Silent Voice", from List of songs recorded by Mumzy Stranger 2015
 "Silent Voice" (サイレント・ボイス) sung by Manami written by :ja:樫原伸彦 2005
 "Silent Voice" (サイレントヴォイス), a Jun Hiroe song, see Mobile Suit Gundam ZZ
 "Silent Voice", a song and single by Innocence (band) 1991
 "A Silent Voice", a song by FripSide from the album Decade 2012
 "Silent Voice", a song by Shaman's Harvest song from the album Smokin' Hearts & Broken Guns 2014
 Silent Voices (Dionne Warwick song) 1967

See also
Voice of Silence (disambiguation)
The Voice of the Silence, Helena Blavatsky